Torma Parish was a rural municipality of Estonia, in Jõgeva County. It had a population of 2,472 (2006) and an area of 349.3 km².

Populated places
Torma Parish had 2 small boroughs and 24 villages.

 Small boroughs
Torma - Sadala

 Villages
Iravere - Kantküla - Kodismaa - Koimula - Kõnnu - Leedi - Liikatku - Lilastvere - Näduvere - Ookatku - Oti - Rääbise - Rassiku - Reastvere - Sätsuvere - Tähkvere - Tealama - Tuimõisa - Tõikvere - Vaiatu - Vanamõisa - Võidivere - Võtikvere

References

External links